Persatuan Sepak Bola Indonesia Pegunungan Bintang, commonly known as Persigubin Pegunungan Bintang, or Persigubin, is an Indonesian football club based in Bintang Mountains Regency, Highland Papua. The club plays in the Liga 3.

Honours
Liga 3 Papua
Runners-up: 2021

References

External links
Liga-Indonesia.co.id

Football clubs in Indonesia
Football clubs in Highland Papua
Association football clubs established in 1998
1998 establishments in Indonesia